Connecticut Transit New Britain Division and Connecticut Transit Bristol Division is one division of Connecticut Transit that collectively provides local bus service to four towns in the Central Connecticut Region with connections to CT Transit Hartford Division in downtown New Britain, downtown Bristol, along the Berlin Turnpike, at UConn Health, at Tunxis Community College, CT Transit Waterbury Division and Middletown Area Transit in Cromwell. Service in both divisions operates daily (including major holidays) along 13 routes.

Routes
These are the routes in the New Britain and Bristol Divisions. The 41 route (formerly P route) is contiguous with Hartford Division. As of December 8, 2014, each New Britain or Bristol route is now identified by a numbered route between 501 and 549.

New Britain routes
{| class="wikitable"
|-
!Route (new)
!Route (old)
!Route Name
!Outbound terminus
!Outbound connections
!Notes
!Operator
|-
|41
|P
|Hartford
|41 (P): Hartford via Newington CenterHNB: Hartford via I-84
|
Downtown Hartford: CTtransit Hartford: all routesCTfastrak: 101, 102, 121, 128, 923, 924, 925, 928
|
 All Route 41 trips run locally, save for the rush hour HNB route to or from New Britain via I-84.
|
DATTCO
CTtransit Hartford
|-
|501
|AR
|Arch St
|501 (AR): Hosp of Central CT-MidState Medical Ctr-Westfield Meriden501C (AR): Hosp of Central CT-Clinic Dr
|
Westfield Meriden: CTtransit Meriden: 561(A1) Middletown Area Transit: M-Link
|
 Route 501C to Clinic Dr. is the last trip of the day.
 Serves CTfastraks New Britain Station.
 Provides through-route service to Route 505 (Burritt St).
|rowspan="7"|
New Britain Transportation
|-
|502
|PB/PL
|Black Rock Ave
|502 (PB): Bristol City Hall via Plainville Ctr
|Plainville Center: CTtransit New Britain: 503(C)CTfastrak: 102Downtown Bristol: CTtransit Bristol: 541(BL), 542, 543CTfastrak: 102, 923
|
|-
|503
|C
|Corbin Ave
|503 (C): CT Commons-Tunxis Comm College
|Plainville Center: CTtransit New Britain: 502(PB)CTfastrak: 102Tunxis Community College''':CTtransit Bristol: 541(BL)CTtransit Hartford: 66(E)
|
 Through-route service is available with Route 541 at Tunxis Community College (Farmington).
|-
|505
|B
|Burritt St
|505 (B): Hosp for Special Care-Pinnacle Business Park
|
|
 Operates outbound from Downtown New Britain via Broad St. and inbound via Myrtle St.
 Serves CTfastraks New Britain Station.
 Provides through-route service to Route 501 (Arch St).
|-
|506
|F
|Farmington Ave
|506 (F): UCONN Health506F (F): Farm Springs-UCONN Health
|UConn Health Center: CTtransit Hartford: 66(E)CTfastrak: 121Batterson Park Park & Ride: CTtransit Hartford: 902 (2)
|
|-
|507
|O
|Oak St
|507 (O): CCSU-Country Club Rd
|CCSU: CTfastrak: 128, 140, 144
|
|-  bgcolor = "dddddd"
|508
|S
|Stanley St
|Route 508 has been replaced by the new Route 128 (Hartford/New Britain via Westfarms & Stanley St) in its entirety. Route 128 will then continue to Downtown Hartford via New Britain Ave. in West Hartford (and serves the same stops as Route 39) and the CTfastrak guideway. Although neither Brittany Farms nor Country Club Rd. will be served by Route 128, passengers can transfer to Route 507 at CCSU for service to Country Club and Alexander Rds. or the new Route 144 (Westfarms/Wethersfield via Newington Center) at Westfarms for service to Brittany Farms.
|
|
|-
|509
|ES
|East St
|509 (ES): Dix & Fifth
|East Main St Station (CTfastrak): CTfastrak: 101, 102, 128
|
 Provides through-route service to Route 510 (South St).
|rowspan="2"|
DATTCO
|-
|510
|SS
|South St
|510 (SS): CT DSS (New Britn)510C (SS): CT DSS(New Britn)–Corbin Russwin510J (SS): CT DSS (New Britn) via John Downey Dr510S (SS): Fulton St
|
|
 The 510C trips to Corbin Russwin and 510D trips to the New Britain Industrial area (John Downey Dr) operate weekdays only at peak times.
 Provides through-route service to Route 509 (East St).
|-
|512
|BK/TPK
|South Main St 
|512C (BK): Berlin RR Sta (Amtrak)-Walmart Cromwell-Berlin Tpke512N (FE): NORPACO FOODS via Route 9512 (BK): Berlin RR Sta (Amtrak)-Webster Square
|Walmart, Cromwell: Middletown Area Transit: E, MPrice Chopper, Newington':CTtransit Hartford: 45(BTF), 47(T), 69(W)
|
When Route 45 (Berlin Tpke. Flyer) is unavailable, Hartford area passengers can transfer to Route 512 at Price Chopper/Dick's to get to Walmart (Newington) and Stew Leonard's.
|rowspan="2"|
New Britain Transportation
|}

Bristol routes
The following routes connect with CTfastrak'' Route 102 (Hartford/Bristol via New Britain) and 923 (Hartford Express) at the Bristol City Hall:

See also
Connecticut Transit Hartford
Connecticut Transit New Haven
Connecticut Transit Stamford
Northeast Transportation Company

All of the above provide CT Transit route service.

References

External links
Official website for CT Transit
New Britain Transportation Company

Bus transportation in Connecticut
Transportation in Hartford County, Connecticut